Batu is a common masculine Central Asian name. It is also written as باتو.

In Turkish, "Batu" means "Prevailing", and/or "Preponderant". It also connotes "The West" since "Batu" resembles the word "Batı" which means "west" in Turkish.

In Mongolian, "Batu" means firm/stable. 

In Malay and Bahasa Indonesia, "Batu" means rock, stone or boulder.

Real People

Given name
 Saru Batu Savcı Bey, Ertuğrul's eldest son and older brother of Osman I and Gündüz see Turkish Wikipedia article.
 Batu Khan, Mongol ruler and founder of the Golden Horde.
 Batumöngke Dayan Khagan, 15th century Mongol khagan.
 Osman Batur(1899-1951), Kazakh-Turkic warrior who fought against the Chinese and Russians in East-Turkestan.

Entertainment 
 Batu Çetin, founder and vocalist of Cenotaph
 Pelin Batu - https://en.wikipedia.org/wiki/Pelin_Batu - author, actress, historian, and television personality.

Surname
İnal Batu, a Turkish diplomat.
Pelin Batu, a Turkish actress and television personality.

Turkish masculine given names